Juliano Roberto Antonello (born 19 November 1979), commonly known as Juca, is a Brazilian football coach and former player who played as a defensive midfielder. He is the current head coach of Athletico Paranaense's under-20 team.

Juca is best known for his tackling, great teamwork and powerful shooting ability.

Career
Born in Passo Fundo (RS), Juca came through the youth categories of Internacional, making his senior debuts in 2000. He later went on to play for several clubs in his homeland, namely Criciúma, Marília, Fluminense, Botafogo (two spells), and Guarani.

On 15 June 2007, Juca completed his move to Partizan on a two-year deal, becoming the first ever Brazilian player to join the club. He made his official debut for Partizan on 19 July 2007, helping his team to a 6–1 away win over Zrinjski in the first leg of the UEFA Cup first qualifying round. Juca scored his first competitive goal for the club on 26 September 2007 in a 4–1 Serbian Cup win over Rad. His first season in Serbia was a success with Juca helping Partizan win the national league and cup titles. In his second season at Partizan, Juca appeared 18 times and scored two goals, winning another double.

In June 2009, Juca moved to Spain on a free transfer to play for Deportivo La Coruña. He signed a contract which would keep him at the club until June 2011. Juca made his La Liga debut on 29 August 2009, playing the full 90 minutes in a 2–3 loss against Real Madrid at Santiago Bernabéu. He scored his first goal for the club on 23 September 2009, as Deportivo won 3–0 against Xerez.

In September 2011, after four years abroad, Juca returned to Brazil and signed with Ceará. He played there until the end of the 2012 season. In January 2013, Juca moved to the United Arab Emirates and joined Dubai until the end of the 2012–13 season.

On 2 January 2014, after six months without a club, Juca made another return to his country and joined Novo Hamburgo. He was eventually released by the club only two weeks later, without making his official debut.

Statistics

Honours
Criciúma
 Campeonato Brasileiro Série B: 2002
Partizan
 Serbian SuperLiga: 2007–08, 2008–09
 Serbian Cup: 2007–08, 2008–09
Ceará
 Campeonato Cearense: 2012

References

External links
 
 
 

Association football midfielders
Botafogo de Futebol e Regatas players
Brazilian expatriate footballers
Brazilian expatriate sportspeople in Serbia
Brazilian expatriate sportspeople in Spain
Brazilian expatriate sportspeople in the United Arab Emirates
Brazilian footballers
Campeonato Brasileiro Série A players
Campeonato Brasileiro Série B players
Ceará Sporting Club players
Criciúma Esporte Clube players
Deportivo de La Coruña players
Dubai CSC players
Esporte Clube Novo Hamburgo players
Expatriate footballers in Serbia
Expatriate footballers in Spain
Expatriate footballers in the United Arab Emirates
FK Partizan players
Fluminense FC players
Guarani FC players
La Liga players
Marília Atlético Clube players
People from Passo Fundo
Serbian SuperLiga players
Sport Club Internacional players
UAE Pro League players
1979 births
Living people
Sportspeople from Rio Grande do Sul
Brazilian football managers
Campeonato Brasileiro Série A managers
Ceará Sporting Club managers